Centre Grove is a census-designated place (CDP) in Cumberland County, New Jersey, United States. It is in the center part of the county, on the east side of Lawrence Township. It is bordered to the east by the city of Millville.

Centre Grove was first listed as a CDP prior to the 2020 census with a population of 1,281.

Demographics

References 

Census-designated places in Cumberland County, New Jersey
Census-designated places in New Jersey
Lawrence Township, Cumberland County, New Jersey